The Vienne is a major river in south-western France. It is a significant left tributary of the lower Loire. It supports numerous hydroelectric dams, and it is the main river of the northern part of the Nouvelle-Aquitaine region.

Two French departments are named after the Vienne: Haute-Vienne (87) in the Limousin region and Vienne (86) both in the Nouvelle-Aquitaine region.

Course
The Vienne rises as a spring in the department of Corrèze, at the foot of Mont Audouze, on the Plateau de Millevaches, near Peyrelevade. It then flows roughly west to the city of Limoges where it once played a major role in the famous Limoges porcelain industry.  A little way after Limoges it takes a turn to the north.  En route to its confluence with the Loire, the Vienne is joined by the rivers Creuse and Clain. Finally, after a journey of  372 km it reaches the Loire at Candes-Saint-Martin in the department of Indre-et-Loire.

The Vienne flows through the following departments and towns:

Corrèze: Peyrelevade 
Creuse
Haute-Vienne: Eymoutiers, Saint-Léonard-de-Noblat, Limoges, Aixe-sur-Vienne, Saint-Junien
Charente: Chabanais, Confolens
Vienne: L'Isle-Jourdain, Lussac-les-Châteaux, Chauvigny, Châtellerault
Indre-et-Loire: L'Île-Bouchard, Chinon

Tributaries include:
 The Creuse, which joins the Vienne north of Châtellerault
 The Clain, which flows through the city of Poitiers, and joins the Vienne in Châtellerault
 The Briance, which joins the Vienne in Condat-sur-Vienne
 The Taurion, which joins the Vienne north of Saint-Priest-Taurion

References

Vienne
 
Rivers of Haute-Vienne
Rivers of Vienne
Rivers of Nouvelle-Aquitaine